Shabbir Kumar (born 26 October 1954) is an Indian playback singer, notable for his work in Hindi cinema. Known for his sweet and resonating vocal texture, Shabbir Kumar is an ardent fan of Mohammed Rafi. He has sung for Amitabh Bachchan, Anil Kapoor, Govinda, Mithun Chakraborty, Sunny Deol, Chunky Pandey, Dharmendra, etc.

Biography
Shabbir Kumar started his music career in Baroda but came in limelight after being picked by one of India's pioneer and leading Orchestra called Melody Makers which performed mainly in Pune & Mumbai. He later joined hands with other Mohammed Rafi's fans as a promoter for the Ek Shaam Rafi Ke Naam show held as a tribute to Mohammed Rafi. Shabbir claims that when he attended Rafi's funeral in 1980, his wristwatch fell into Rafi's open grave. He interpreted the incident as a divine message that he was to be Rafi's successor.

Music director Usha Khanna gave Shabbir Kumar a break in the film Tajurba (1981). Shabbir got a major break, when the director Manmohan Desai, who was looking for a Rafi substitute, noticed him and recommended him to music director duo Laxmikant–Pyarelal (L-P). Within a few days, L-P gave Shabbir Kumar songs in the film Coolie, which was released in 1983. Shabbir's first released film with L-P was Main Intequam Loonga.

Shabbir Kumar was first noted for a duet with Lata Mangeshkar, Shaam Hai Ye Kuch Khoyi Khoyi from Prem Tapasya (1983). Music director Anu Malik got him to sing for Rajiv Kapoor in his debut film Ek Jaan Hain Hum (1983). Shabbir Kumar was acknowledged as a leading playback singer with the film Betaab. Music director Rahul Dev Burman got him to sing all the five songs for Sunny Deol. Also, in 1983, Coolie was released, in which Laxmikant–Pyarelal had given him all the seven songs, six for Amitabh Bachchan, and one for Rishi Kapoor.

In the 1980s, Shabbir Kumar sang for all the leading music directors including Laxmikant–Pyarelal, Rahul Dev Burman, Chitragupt, Kalyanji-Anandji, Rajesh Roshan, Usha Khanna, Bappi Lahiri, Anu Malik, Ravindra Jain, Raamlaxman, Nadeem Shravan, Anand Milind, Jatin–Lalit, Uttam Singh. He did playback singing for leading actors such as Dilip Kumar, Dharmendra, Amitabh Bachchan, Jackie Shroff, Rishi Kapoor, Jeetendra, Mithun Chakraborty, Raj Babbar, Govinda, Chunky Pandey, Sanjay Dutt, Kumar Gaurav, Kamal Haasan, Rajnikanth, Anil Kapoor, Sunny Deol, Rajiv Kapoor and Akshay Kumar. Recently he sang for Ismail Darbar, Shankar–Ehsaan–Loy and A.R. Rahman.

His last Hit songs were Gori Hai Kalaiyan from Aaj Ka Arjun (1990) and Sochna Kya from Ghayal (1990).

Shabbir then started concentrating on stage shows. He sang for many films and private albums in the year 2000, few hits were Ghaath (2000), Awara Paagal Deewana (2002), and Aan: Men at Work (2004). Recently, Shabbir Kumar sang for Akshay Kumar in the movie Housefull (2010) which is a comeback for this singer.

He has sung in different languages like Hindi, Urdu, Marathi, Bengali, Bhojpuri, Punjabi, Rajasthani, Gujarati, Haryanvi, Oriya, Malayalam and English. He is awarded with 34 Gold Discs, 16 Platinum, 1 Kohinoor Disc and also received a number of other awards. Received award as "The Best Playback Singer" in Dubai, U.A.E., "Mohammed Rafi Award" in Bombay first time ever in India, "Kalaa Ratan Award" from President of India Zail Singh as Best Playback Singer. His contributions to Music industry over 6 thousand songs and more than 1500 Films in his portfolio.

He has performed several live concerts in UAE, Europe, South Africa, United States of America and many other places.

Discography 
 "Binak habibi binak" from Awara Paagal Deewana (2002) composed by Anu Malik
 "Apne Dilse Badi Dushmani" from Betaab (1983), composed by Rahul Dev Burman 
 "Badal Yun Garajta Hai" from Betaab (1983), (duet with Lata Mangeshkar)
 "Jab Hum Jawan Honge" from Betaab (1983), (duet with Lata Mangeshkar)
 "Teri Tasveer Mil Gayee" from Betaab (1983)
 "Tumne Dee Awaaz" from Betaab (1983)
 "Kangna Oye Hoye Kangna" from Woh Saat Din (1983), composed by Laxmikant–Pyarelal
 "Pyar Kiya Nahi Jaata" from Woh Saat Din (1983), (duet with Lata Mangeshkar)
 "Saari duniya ka bojh" from Coolie (1983), composed by Laxmikant–Pyarelal
 "Mubarak Ho Tum Sabko Haj Ka Mahina" from Coolie (1983)
 "Mujhe Pineka Shokh Nahin" Coolie (1983) (duet with Alka Yagnik)
 "Bol Do Mitti Bol Soniye" Sohni Mahiwal (1984), composed by Anu Malik, (duet with Asha Bhosle)
 "Mujhe Dulhe Ka Sehra" Sohni Mahiwal (1984), (duet with Asha Bhosle) 
 "Tumse Milkar Naa Jaane Kyon" from Pyar Jhukta Nahin (1985), composed by Laxmikant–Pyarelal
 "Tumhe Apna Saath Banane Se" from  Pyar Jhukta Nahin  (1985), (duet with Lata Mangeshkar)
 "Chahe Lakh Toofan Aaye" from  Pyar Jhukta Nahin  (1985), (duet with Lata Mangeshkar)
 "Ae Doctor Babu" from Piya Ke Gaon (1985), (duet with Alka Yagnik)
 "Zeehal-e-Musqeen" from Ghulami (1985), composed by Laxmikant Pyarelal, (duet with Lata Mangeshkar)
 "Zindagi Har Kadam Ek Nayi Jung" from Meri Jung (1985), composed by Laxmikant–Pyarelal
 "Buri Nazarwale Tera" from Mard (1985), composed by Anu Malik
 "O Maa Shero wali" from Mard (1985)
 "Aana Jana Laga Rahega" from Giraftaar (1985), composed by Bappi Lahiri
 "Pyar Ke Do Pal Koh" from Pyar Ke Do Pal (1986), composed by Anu Malik
 "Jaano Jaanam Jaaneman" from Sultanat (1986), composed by Kalyanji Anandji
 "Jab Jab Kisi Ladake" from Kala Dhanda Goray Log (1986), (duet with Anuradha Paudwal)
 "Gali Gali Badnaam Hogaya" from Karamdaata (1986)
 "Hairaan Hoon Main" from Jawab Hum Denge (1987), (duet with Anuradha Paudwal)
 "Mere Yaar Ko Mere Allah" from Dacait (1987), composed by Rahul Dev Burman 
 "Tujhe Itna Pyaar Kare" From Kudrat Ka Kanoon (1987), with Lata Mangeshkar
 "Saajan Aajao Wada Yeh" from Aag Hi Aag (1987)
 "So Gaya Ye Jahan" From Tezaab (1988), with Nitin Mukesh 
 "Maine bhi ek geet likha hai" from Hamara Khandan (1988)
 "Gori Hai Kalaiyan" from Aaj Ka Arjun (1990), composed by Bappi Lahiri
 "Sochna Kya Jabi" from Ghayal (1990) (with Kumar Sanu & Asha Bhosle)
 "O Radha Tere Bina" from Radha Ka Sangam (1992),  composed by Anu Malik
 "Tu Pagal Premi Awara" from Shola aur Shabnam (1992)
 "I Don't Know What to do" from Housefull (2010) composed by Shankar–Ehsaan–Loy.

References

External links
 
 

Living people
Indian male playback singers
Bollywood playback singers
Indian Sunni Muslims
1954 births